The international inspection pennant is an international flag for fisheries inspection vessels currently used by the fisheries inspection branches of the European Union, France, New Zealand and Norway. It is also used by various FIRMS member organisations such as the NEAFC, NAFO and ICSEAF.

History 

The international inspection pennant was ratified by the North Sea Fisheries Convention of 1882.

See also 
International maritime signal flags
Yellow flag (contagion)

References 

International flags
Maritime signalling
Signal flags